This Can't Be Love may refer to: 

"This Can't Be Love" (song), a 1938 song by Rodgers and Hart, introduced in the musical play, The Boys from Syracuse
This Can't Be Love (film), a 1994 television film